Alderney Hospital is a hospital in Alderney, a suburb of Poole, Dorset.

History 
Alderney Hospital was built in 1888 for the care of the elderly; it now specialises in dementia and mental health with both in and out patients.

In 2018, £5.9million was given by the Department of Health to aid older people's inpatient mental health services at the hospital.

See also 
 Healthcare in Dorset

References 

Hospital buildings completed in 1888
Buildings and structures in Poole
Hospitals in Dorset
NHS hospitals in England
1888 establishments in England